The 1960–61 IHL season was the 16th season of the International Hockey League, a North American minor professional league. Eight teams participated in the regular season, and the St. Paul Saints won the Turner Cup.

Regular season

Turner Cup-Playoffs

External links
 Season 1960/61 on hockeydb.com

IHL
International Hockey League (1945–2001) seasons